Educational Philosophy and Theory is a peer-reviewed philosophy journal covering educational theory and the philosophy of education. It was established in 1969 by Les Brown (University of New South Wales), with its first issue being published in May of that year. It went on to become the official journal of the Philosophy of Education Society of Australasia, which was founded the following year. It is published fourteen times per year by Taylor & Francis and the editor-in-chief is Michael Adrian Peters (Beijing Normal University). According to the Journal Citation Reports, the journal has a 2017 impact factor of 1.267, ranking it 177th out of 238 journals in the category "Education & Educational Research".

References

External links

Philosophy of education
Philosophy journals
Education journals
Taylor & Francis academic journals
Publications established in 1969
English-language journals
Education theory
Journals published between 13 and 25 times per year